Francis MacDonald is a British musician and composer, best known as the drummer of Teenage Fanclub.

Francis or Frances MacDonald or McDonald may also refer to:

Francis McDonald (1891–1968), American film actor
Francis McDonald (politician) (1860–1938), Australian member of parliament
F. James McDonald (1922–2010), engineer
Frances MacDonald (1873–1921), Scottish artist
Frances Macdonald (English artist) (1914–2002), English artist
Francis McDonald (footballer) (born 1975), Saint Lucian footballer and football manager

See also
Frank McDonald (disambiguation)